Filton is a town and civil parish in South Gloucestershire, England,  north of Bristol. Along with nearby Patchway and Bradley Stoke, Filton forms part of the Bristol urban area and has become an overflow settlement for the city. Filton Church dates back to the 12th century and is designated a Grade II listed building.

The name of the town comes from the Old English feleþe (hay), and tūn (farm, field). The name dates back to at least 1187.

Filton has large areas of open space which include several playing fields, a golf course and the former Filton Airport (closed in 2012).

Connections, districts and facilities
Filton can be reached from Junction 1 of the M32 motorway, or from Junction 16 of the M5 motorway. The town is well served by rail with Filton Abbey Wood serving areas in the south of the town, Bristol Parkway serving areas to the north and east and Patchway in the west of the town.

Districts within the town include East Filton, Filton Park and Northville. East Filton, which has grown up east of the Bristol-South Wales railway line and is mostly in the neighbouring civil parish of Stoke Gifford, contains the offices of the Ministry of Defence's Defence Procurement Agency, plus a shopping park. Filton Park is a suburb of Bristol and lies directly on the city border, sandwiched between the A38 trunk road and Southmead Road. Filton itself lies to the north and east of Filton Park. Monks Park is to the south. Housing in Filton Park is mainly privately owned, semi-detached and 1930s built. Pre-World War I properties in the district tend to be quite large, with generous gardens. Extensive playing fields border the north-western side of Southmead Road. The golf links, on the hillside beyond, is owned by Filton Golf Club. The area has a primary school and a playgroup. Filton Park is regarded as a desirable place to live since it is close to major centres of employment such as BAE Systems, and Defence Equipment & Support at Abbey Wood.

Filton's educational facilities include South Gloucestershire and Stroud College, Abbeywood Community School and several primary schools. The University of the West of England is at nearby Frenchay.

Filton has two main shopping areas – the Shield Centre (on the site of the former Shield Laundry) and Abbey Wood Retail Park, as well as other shops. To the east of the town there is a small area of woodland known as Splatt's Abbey Wood.

Industry

Filton has an aerospace connection dating back to the establishment of the Bristol Aeroplane Company. Aerospace companies in Filton include BAE Systems, Airbus, GKN, Rolls-Royce and MBDA, all located around the former Filton Aerodrome. The Concorde supersonic airliner was built here in the late 1960s and 1970s; on 26 November 2003 Concorde 216 (G-BOAF) made the final flight of a Concorde, returning to Filton to be kept there permanently as the centrepiece of the Aerospace Bristol museum, which opened in 2017. This museum also houses the Bristol Aero Collection and examples of planes, helicopters, missiles and other engineering projects built in Filton and Bristol.

Other employers include the MOD, Viridor, Hewlett Packard, Hewlett Packard Enterprise and the Royal Mail. Filton is also home to the regional blood processing facility, NHS Blood and Transplant Filton.

Bristol Cars made hand-built luxury cars in Filton from 1946 until 2011. The company has neither distributors nor dealers and deals directly with customers; they have a showroom and head office in Kensington, London. They claimed to be the last wholly British-owned luxury car builder. The company went into administration in March 2011, and was acquired by the research and development firm Kamkorp.

Population 
The population of the parish at the 2011 Census was 10,607. The Filton built-up area defined by the Office for National Statistics is a large outer suburban area north of Bristol which includes Almondsbury, Patchway, Little Stoke, Stoke Gifford and Bradley Stoke, and had a population of 59,495 in 2011.

Filton is an ethnically diverse town, with a proportion of white British residents close to the national average.

Administration 

Filton Town Council is a parish council made up of thirteen councillors and forming the first tier of local government.

Filton was in Gloucestershire until 1974 when it became part of the newly formed county of Avon. In 1996 the Avon authority was abolished and the area became part of the unitary authority of South Gloucestershire and rejoined the ceremonial county of Gloucestershire.

Filton is represented in the House of Commons by Jack Lopresti, Conservative Party Member of Parliament (MP) for the constituency of Filton and Bradley Stoke.

An electoral ward with the same name exists. The area and population are identical to those of the parish.

Filton is represented on South Gloucestershire District Council by Cllr Chris Wood (Con) and Cllr Adam Monk (Lab).

History

Thousands of mites, farthings and other coins of the Roman emperors, Domitian, Constantine and Constans were found in a bank by some boys in 1880. Many of the coins were in excellent condition.

At the dawn of the 20th century, Filton was a small village, still detached from the city of Bristol to the south. Farming was the principal occupation. However, there was a large factory-like laundry in the village, opposite Filton House, owned by Samuel Shield. The Bristol to South Wales railway line passed through the village. There was a small station near the site of the current Abbey Wood station. A much larger railway station, known as Filton Junction, opened in 1910, after the alternate rail route from Bristol to London was finished. In 1907 the northern terminus for Bristol Tramways was moved out from Horfield to Filton. Tram production in the tramway sheds commenced in 1908. The manufacture of aeroplanes started in the Bristol Tramway sheds in 1910 and aero-engine production started in 1920.

Between the wars, Filton expanded rapidly to become a suburb of Bristol. Initially development (semi-detached housing) was concentrated on the western side of the A38, in an area known as Filton Park. In the 1930s, the area on the eastern side of the A38 started to be developed. Eventually, Filton became part of the Bristol conurbation, although it remained, as it does now, outside the city boundary. During the 1920s and 1930s, two infant/primary schools and one secondary school were built in Filton to accommodate the growing number of school-age children in the area. Many of these children were evacuated when World War II started in 1939, but returned later, during the Phoney War. Filton High School, originally a grammar school, but later a comprehensive, started to take pupils in 1960. In 2010 Filton High was demolished and replaced with Abbeywood Community School.

In the late 1940s, the main runway of Filton Aerodrome was greatly extended for the Bristol Brabazon project. Charlton village was demolished and the pre-war Filton bypass was severed. In the early 1960s, a new bypass was constructed, roughly parallel to the old one, and this later became part of the M5 motorway.

In the early 1950s the Bristol Aeroplane Company opened a purpose-built technical college to help train their apprentice intake. Attached to the college were also basic training workshops. In 1960 the education authority opened Filton Technical College on the opposite side of Filton Avenue to the BAC college. Later the various colleges merged and eventually became the South Gloucestershire and Stroud College.

Sandwiched between roads, factories, railway lines and the aerodrome, Filton expanded little after World War II. However, from the late 1970s a trading estate slowly developed on the eastern side of the Bristol/South Wales railway line in what is now known as East Filton.  During the mid-1970s the A38 trunk road was upgraded to a dual carriageway. Station Road, a country lane in the early part of the 20th century, was also widened to become a dual carriageway and form part of the Avon Ring Road. In 1973, the Rolls-Royce car division was separated as Rolls-Royce Motors. Rolls-Royce (1971) Limited (the engine division) was privatised in 1987 as Rolls-Royce plc. Later, the Ministry of Defence set up a large office complex, known as Abbey Wood, in the same area.

Twin towns
 St Vallier-sur-Rhône, France
 Witzenhausen, Germany

Sport
The Bristol Academy of Sport is based at South Gloucestershire and Stroud College. Bristol City W.F.C. are based at the Stoke Gifford Stadium on site.
Filton Cycling Speedway Club was formed in January 2006. The club uses a cycle track built by Filton Town Council and recognised to be one of the best in the country, with its setting in Elm Park. 
St Vallier FC (named after its French twin) is a youth football team.
Filton Golf Club has an 18-hole course.
There is also a table tennis club.

Climate
Filton has a temperate maritime climate, with comfortable, mostly dry summers and cold, mostly wet winters.

References

External links
 
 

 
Areas of Bristol
Towns in Gloucestershire
South Gloucestershire District
Civil parishes in Gloucestershire